Nikita Omarovich Matskharashvili (born 30 June 1999) is a Russian football player of Georgian descent. He plays for  FC Tekstilshchik Ivanovo.

Club career
He was raised in PFC CSKA Moscow youth system and played for their U19 squad in the 2016–17 UEFA Youth League and 2017–18 UEFA Youth League.

On 6 July 2018, he signed a three-year contract with FC Shinnik Yaroslavl.

He made his debut in the Russian Football National League for FC Shinnik Yaroslavl on 15 September 2018 in a game against FC Krasnodar-2 as an 82nd-minute substitute for Dmitri Samoylov.

References

External links
 Profile by Russian Football National League
 

1999 births
Sportspeople from Sukhumi
Russian people of Abkhazian descent
Georgian emigrants to Russia
Living people
Russian footballers
Russia youth international footballers
Association football midfielders
PFC CSKA Moscow players
FC Shinnik Yaroslavl players
FC Tyumen players
FC Tekstilshchik Ivanovo players
Russian First League players
Russian Second League players